Barfleur may refer to:

 Barfleur, commune in Manche, Normandy
 Barfleur-class ship of the line, Royal Navy ship class
 Battles of Barfleur and La Hougue
 Action at Barfleur, part of the above battles
 HMS Barfleur, name of five ships of the Royal Navy
 MS Barfleur (1992), British ferry

See also